Matthew Paul Bigliardi (September 14, 1920 - February 26, 1996) was seventh bishop of the Episcopal Diocese of Oregon, serving from 1974 to 1985. He later served as bishop in charge of the Convocation of Episcopal Churches in Europe from 1988 to 1993.

References 

Fr. Bigliardi Elected Bishop of Oregon

1920 births
1996 deaths
Place of birth missing
Episcopal Church in Oregon
20th-century American Episcopalians
Bishops of the Convocation of Episcopal Churches in Europe
Episcopal bishops of Oregon
20th-century American clergy